(E,E)-germacrene B synthase (EC 4.2.3.71) is an enzyme with systematic name (2E,6E)-farnesyl-diphosphate diphosphate-lyase ((E,E)-germacrene-B-forming). This enzyme catalyses the following chemical reaction

 (2E,6E)-farnesyl diphosphate  (E,E)-germacrene B + diphosphate

References

External links 
 

EC 4.2.3